Nathaniel Niles Jr. (1791–1869) was an American physician and diplomat. A graduate of Harvard Medical School, he served as special diplomatic agent in Austria-Hungary and as chargé d’affaires to Sardinia.

References

American diplomats
American physicians
Harvard Medical School alumni
1791 births
1869 deaths